The Pine Creek First Nation is a Saulteaux First Nation in Manitoba, Canada. The First Nation's homeland is the Pine Creek 66A reserve, located approximately 110 kilometres north of Dauphin along the southwestern shore of Lake Winnipegosis between the communities of Camperville and Duck Bay. The Rural Municipality of Mountain (South) borders it on the southwest.

The current chief of Pine Creek First Nation is Derek Nepinak. Pine Creek First Nation is part of Treaty 4. , the First Nation's registered population was 3,188, with 1,058 members living on reserves or crown land and 2,130 members living off reserve.

The primary language spoken on the reserve is Saulteaux.

History
The community had a two-storey steeple church erected 1906-1910, but it was destroyed in a fire in 1930. A second church with a single steeple was reconstructed using the first building's salvageable stone walls.

Pine Creek First Nation had a residential school on its Reserve, built 1894-1897. The large four-storey school building was destroyed in 1972.

Reserves 
It is located approximately 110 kilometres north of Dauphin along the southwestern shore of Lake Winnipegosis between the communities of Camperville and Duck Bay. The Rural Municipality of Mountain (South) borders it on the southwest.

Along with 32 other First Nations, Pine Creek First Nation also holds interest on the Treaty Four Reserve Grounds 77, which spans  and is located adjacent to Fort Qu'Appelle, Saskatchewan.

See also
 Aboriginal peoples in Manitoba

References

External links
 AANDC profile
 Aboriginal Canada Portal profile of the First Nation
 Palmer, Gwen. "Camperville and Duck Bay. Part 1 - Camperville" Manitoba Pageant, Autumn 1972, Volume 18, Number 2
 Map of Pine Creek 66A at Statcan

West Region Tribal Council
 
Hudson's Bay Company trading posts
First Nations in Central Manitoba